Dhani Kumharan (Thali) is a small village in the Buhana tehsil of Jhunjhunu district of Rajasthan, India. The village is connected by the gravy road and nearby town are Singhana, Buhana, Thali, Pacheri Bari, Khetri, Chirawa etc. Singahania University is providing education to the people of the villages nearby and giving them the opportunity to lift themselves, educate their children and liberate them from the social taboos.

Villages in Jhunjhunu district